The Ministry of Agriculture and Rural Development is the national executive ministry of the Government of Colombia in charge of the management and oversight of the rural development and agriculture of Colombia.

Functions
The main functions of the ministry of Agriculture are to formulate politics for the development of the agricultural, fishing and rural development sectors; and to manage the formulation of plans, programs and projects needed to develop these sectors, specially the rural areas of the country. The ministry must present plans and programs to the National Development Plan and prepare and present to the Congress of Colombia draft laws related to these sectors. The ministry of Agriculture must define with the Ministry of Foreign Affairs, the international negotiations related to these sectors. The Ministry is also entitled to create, organize, form and assign through resolutions duties to internal work groups and advising groups within the guidelines previously set.

References

External links
 Official site

 
Agriculture and Rural Development
Agricultural organisations based in Colombia
Colombia
Agriculture and Rural Development
Spatial planning ministries
1994 establishments in Colombia